The African olive pigeon or Rameron pigeon (Columba arquatrix) is a pigeon which is a resident breeding bird in much of eastern and southern Africa from Ethiopia to the Cape. Populations also are found in western Angola, southwestern Saudi Arabia and northern Yemen. It is locally common, although sizeable gaps in its distribution occur due to its habitat requirements.

Description
Its back and wings are maroon, with the shoulders heavily speckled with white spots. The underparts are maroon with heavy white spotting, and the head is grey with yellow patches around the eye, and a yellow bill. The neck plumage, used in display, is streaked maroon and white, the underwing and undertail are dark grey, and the feet are yellow.

Females are very similar but somewhat duller. Juvenile birds have the maroon and grey replaced with dark brown, the bare parts are a dull greenish-yellow, and the wing feathers have pale fringes. In flight, this pigeon looks very dark. Its flight is quick, with the regular beats and an occasional sharp flick of the wings which are characteristic of pigeons in general. The call is a loud  coo coo.

Habitat
It will use mountain fynbos, second growth, and clearings, and feed on agricultural land when not persecuted.

Behaviour

Breeding
The eggs are incubated for 17–20 days to hatching, and the chicks fledge in another 20 days.

The male has a display consisting of deep bows, and a display flight which consists of a climb, wing clapping, and slow glide down.

Feeding
The African olive pigeon feeds on fruit and berries, mainly picked in the canopy, but it will also descend for fallen fruit and take some insects and caterpillars. In the south of its range, it favours the fruit of a highly invasive plant, the bugweed, Solanum mauritianum. Birds fly considerable distances from their roosts to feeding areas, and young or nonbreeding birds form flocks.

Geophagy has been observed in this species.

Gallery

References

 Gibbs, Barnes and Cox, Pigeons and Doves (Pica Press 2001) 
 Ian Sinclair, Phil Hockey and Warwick Tarboton, SASOL Birds of Southern Africa (Struik 2002)

External links 
 (Rameron pigeon = ) African olive pigeon - Species text in The Atlas of Southern African Birds.

Columba (genus)
Birds of Africa
Birds of Sub-Saharan Africa
Birds described in 1808